Niki Xanthou (born 11 October 1973 in Rhodes) is a Greek long jumper.

Xanthou set nine national records in long jump during her career. Her personal best, and national record, is 7.03 metres, achieved in August 1997 in Bellinzona. At the age of 22 she gave an impressive performance in the Olympic games final in Atlanta, in which she took the 4th place with 6.97 m.

She won the Mediterranean Games of 1997 in Bari and the European under 23 Cup in 1994. The greatest achievements in her career were the second place in the 1997 World Championships in Athens and the gold medal in 2002 European Indoor Championships in Vienna.

Honours

References

1973 births
Living people
Greek female long jumpers
Athletes (track and field) at the 1996 Summer Olympics
Athletes (track and field) at the 2000 Summer Olympics
Athletes (track and field) at the 2004 Summer Olympics
Olympic athletes of Greece
World Athletics Championships medalists
People from Rhodes
Goodwill Games medalists in athletics
Mediterranean Games gold medalists for Greece
Mediterranean Games medalists in athletics
Athletes (track and field) at the 1997 Mediterranean Games
Competitors at the 1998 Goodwill Games
Sportspeople from the South Aegean